The 2021–22 Croatian Football Cup was the 31st season of Croatia's football knockout competition. It was sponsored by the betting company SuperSport and known as the SuperSport Hrvatski nogometni kup for sponsorship purposes. The defending champions were Dinamo Zagreb, having won their 16th title the previous year by defeating Istra 1961 in the final.

Calendar

Participating clubs
The following 48 teams qualified for the competition:

Preliminary round
The draw for the preliminary single-legged round was held on 3 August 2021 and the matches were scheduled on 25 August 2021.

* Matches played on 21 August.
** Match played on 24 August.

First round
The draw for the preliminary single-legged round was held on 26 August 2021 and the matches were scheduled on 22 September 2021.

* Match played on 14 September.
** Match played on 15 September.
*** Matches played on 21 September.

Second round
The second round was scheduled for 27 October 2021. The teams were drawn by tie number where winner of tie No. 1 plays against winner of tie No. 16 and so on, with bigger numbers hosting a tie.

* Matches played on 26 October.
** Match played on 13 November.

Quarter-finals
The quarter-finals were scheduled for 1 December 2021.

* Matches played on 30 November.

Semi-finals
The semi-finals were scheduled for 2 and 9 March 2022.

Final

The final was played on 26 May 2022.

Top scorers 

Source: Statistika hrvatskog nogometa

References

Croatian Football Cup seasons
Croatia
Croatian Cup, 2021-22